Gianni Nazzaro (27 October 1948 – 27 July 2021) was an Italian singer and actor.

Background 
Born in Naples, Nazzaro started his career with the stage name of Buddy, recording 59 singles, mainly cover songs, between 1965 and 1968. In 1968 Nazzaro started to perform with his real name and he took part at the music contest Un disco per l'estate with the song "Solo noi". In 1970 he won the Napoli Music Festival with the song "Me chiamme ammore". After a series of successful hits, in the eighties Nazzaro gradually slowed his musical production, focusing with some success in stage musicals.

Personal life 
Gianni Nazzaro was the son of vaudeville actor and gossip columnist Erminio Nazzaro. He was the second of four siblings, two sisters and a brother. Nazzaro married Nada Ovcina during the first years of the 1970s. They had two children, Junior, born in 1973, and Giorgia, born in 1976. Nazzaro and Ovcina eventually divorced, but after years of estrangement, they reestablished their relationship in 2016. Ovcina remarried Nazzaro just hours before his death in a Roman hospital from lung cancer, on 27 July 2021.

Discography

Selected singles
 1968: "Solo noi"
 1968: "In fondo ai sogni miei"
 1969: "Incontri d'estate"
 1970: "L'amore è una colomba" 
 1970: "Me chiamme ammore" 
 1971: "Bianchi cristalli sereni"
 1971: "Far l'amore con te"
 1972: "Non voglio innamorarmi mai"
 1972: "Quanto è bella lei"
 1972: "La nostra canzone" 
 1973: "Il primo sogno proibito" 
 1974: "A modo mio"
 1974: "Questo sì che è amore"
 1974: "Piccola mia piccola"
 1976: "Me ne vado"
 1977: "Mi sta scoppiando il cuore"
 1980: "Uomo di strada"
 1981: "Sì"
 1983: "Mi sono innamorato di mia moglie"
 1985: "Noi due soli"

Studio albums
 1971: Gianni Nazzaro (CGD, FGL 5088)
 1972: Gianni Nazzaro (Fans, GPX 7)
 1973: C'è un momento del giorno (in cui penso a te) (CGD, 65412)
 1974: Questo sì che è amore (CGD, 69080)
 1975: C'era una volta il night (CGD, 69157)
 1976: Le due facce di Gianni Nazzaro (CGD, 81990)

References

External links
 
 
 

1948 births
2021 deaths
Deaths from lung cancer in Lazio
Italian pop singers
Musicians from Naples